Anne Ryman is an American journalist. In 2018, she won a George Polk Award, and a Pulitzer Prize.

Life 
Ryman is Senior Reporter at The Arizona Reporter.

References

External links 
 Anne Ryman

Living people
George Polk Award recipients
Pulitzer Prize winners for journalism
Journalists from Arizona
Year of birth missing (living people)